Alcippe (Ancient Greek: Ἀλκίππη Alkippē) was a name attributed to a number of figures in Greek mythology.

 Alcippe, daughter of Ares and Aglaulus. When Halirrhotius, son of Poseidon, raped her (or attempted to), Ares killed him, a crime for which he was tried in a court, the first trial in history, which took place on the hill near the Acropolis of Athens named Areopagus, named, according to this etiological myth, after Ares.  He was acquitted in court by all of the other Olympian gods.
 Alcippe, an Amazon who vowed to remain a virgin.  She was killed by Heracles during his ninth labor.
 Alcippe, mother of Daedalus by Eupalamus, son of Metion. Her other possible children were Metiadusa and Perdix.
 Alcippe, one of the Alcyonides, daughters of the giant Alcyoneus. She was the sister of Anthe, Asteria, Drimo, Methone, Pallene and Phthonia (Phosthonia or Chthonia). When their father Alcyoneus was slain by Heracles, these girls threw themselves into the sea from Kanastraion, which is the peak of Pellene. They were then transformed into halcyons (kingfishers) by the goddess Amphitrite.
 Alcippe, one of the attendants of Helen.
 Alcippe, a princess of Pisa, Elis as the daughter of King Oenomaus and thus, sister of Hippodamia. She married Evenus of Aetolia, the son of Ares and Sterope, by whom she bore a daughter Marpessa.
Alcippe, Mysian daughter of Poseidon and sister of Astraeus. She was mistakenly deflowered by her brother who after realizing what he had done, flung himself into the river Adurus which bore his name (Astraeus) after the incident. The river was later on called Caicus, from the son of Hermes and Ocyrrhoe.

Notes

References 

 Apollodorus, The Library with an English Translation by Sir James George Frazer, F.B.A., F.R.S. in 2 Volumes, Cambridge, MA, Harvard University Press; London, William Heinemann Ltd. 1921. ISBN 0-674-99135-4. Online version at the Perseus Digital Library. Greek text available from the same website.
Diodorus Siculus, The Library of History translated by Charles Henry Oldfather. Twelve volumes. Loeb Classical Library. Cambridge, Massachusetts: Harvard University Press; London: William Heinemann, Ltd. 1989. Vol. 3. Books 4.59–8. Online version at Bill Thayer's Web Site
 Diodorus Siculus, Bibliotheca Historica. Vol 1-2. Immanel Bekker. Ludwig Dindorf. Friedrich Vogel. in aedibus B. G. Teubneri. Leipzig. 1888–1890. Greek text available at the Perseus Digital Library.
 Homer, The Odyssey with an English Translation by A.T. Murray, PH.D. in two volumes. Cambridge, MA., Harvard University Press; London, William Heinemann, Ltd. 1919. Online version at the Perseus Digital Library. Greek text available from the same website.
 Lucius Mestrius Plutarchus, Moralia with an English Translation by Frank Cole Babbitt. Cambridge, MA. Harvard University Press. London. William Heinemann Ltd. 1936. Online version at the Perseus Digital Library. Greek text available from the same website.
Lucius Mestrius Plutarchus, Morals translated from the Greek by several hands. Corrected and revised by. William W. Goodwin, PH. D. Boston. Little, Brown, and Company. Cambridge. Press Of John Wilson and son. 1874. 5. Online version at the Perseus Digital Library.
 Pausanias, Description of Greece with an English Translation by W.H.S. Jones, Litt.D., and H.A. Ormerod, M.A., in 4 Volumes. Cambridge, MA, Harvard University Press; London, William Heinemann Ltd. 1918. . Online version at the Perseus Digital Library
Pausanias, Graeciae Descriptio. 3 vols. Leipzig, Teubner. 1903.  Greek text available at the Perseus Digital Library.
 Pseudo-Plutarch, De fluviis, in Plutarch's morals, Volume V, edited and translated by William Watson Goodwin, Boston: Little, Brown & Co., 1874. Online version at the Perseus Digital Library.
 Smith, William, Dictionary of Greek and Roman Biography and Mythology, London (1873). Online version at the Perseus Digital Library.
Suida, Suda Encyclopedia translated by Ross Scaife, David Whitehead, William Hutton, Catharine Roth, Jennifer Benedict, Gregory Hays, Malcolm Heath Sean M. Redmond, Nicholas Fincher, Patrick Rourke, Elizabeth Vandiver, Raphael Finkel, Frederick Williams, Carl Widstrand, Robert Dyer, Joseph L. Rife, Oliver Phillips and many others. Online version at the Topos Text Project.

Amazons (Greek mythology)
Children of Ares
Children of Poseidon
Mythological Thracian women
Attican characters in Greek mythology
Thracian characters in Greek mythology